Crib Goch is described as a "knife-edged" arête in the Snowdonia National Park in Gwynedd, Wales. The name means "red ridge" in the Welsh language.

All routes which tackle Crib Goch are considered mountaineering routes in winter or scrambles in summer—meaning that they must cross "graded territory" as defined in Steve Ashton's Scrambles in Snowdonia. The easiest of these lines (the ‘bad step’ part of the route) is given a scrambling grade of Grade 1 (the most difficult being Grade 3—routes more difficult than Grade 3 are considered rock climbs).

Route

The classic traverse of Crib Goch from East to West leads up from the Pyg track to a ‘bad step’, where hands and feet are both needed briefly. It is followed by ascent to the arête, before tackling three rock-pinnacles to a grassy col at Bwlch Coch. This first part of the ridge is exposed with precipices below, having resulted in several fatalities, even of experienced mountaineers;  the Snowdonia National Park Authority describes it as ‘not a mountain for the inexperienced’. It is also possible to ascend Crib Goch's North Ridge, which adjoins the main ridge. The route is far more difficult in high winds or frozen ground, and so it's recommended that walkers check the weather forecast beforehand.

It is possible to ascend Crib Goch from Bwlch y Moch SH663552 or from Nant Peris, an ascent via Cwm Beudu Mawr.

From the col the ridge rises again, joining the main Snowdon ridge via the sister peak Garnedd Ugain in the west. Here the path meets the Pyg Track (which descends to Pen-y-Pass) at Bwlch Glas (marked by a large standing stone), before the final climb to Snowdon summit. To the south of the arête lie the lakes of Glaslyn and Llyn Llydaw. To the north is the Llanberis Pass.  Crib Goch is classed as a Welsh 3000er and is also often climbed as the first part of the Snowdon Horseshoe, which goes on over Garnedd Ugain, Snowdon and Y Lliwedd, before returning to Pen-y-Pass.

Crib Goch is one of the wettest spots in the United Kingdom, with an average of  rainfall a year over the past 30 years.

References

External links

  Crib Goch Visit Wales Video
Climbing Crib Goch video
Newspaper Feature: Hypnotherapy put to the test on Crib Goch. Can hypnosis really cure a fear of heights?

www.geograph.co.uk : photos of Crib Goch
www.walkupsnowdon.co.uk : Details of the Scrambling Route and map

Hewitts of Wales
Mountains and hills of Snowdonia
Nuttalls
Ridges of Wales
Furths
Beddgelert
Llanberis
Mountains and hills of Gwynedd